Suicide in Bangladesh is a common cause of unnatural death and a long term social issue. Of all the people reported dead due to suicide worldwide every year, 2.06% are Bangladeshi.

Statistics 
According to a report by the World Health Organization 19,697 people died by suicide in Bangladesh in 2011. According to Police Headquarters 11,095 people died by suicide in Bangladesh in 2017. According to a report by Shaheed Suhrawardy Medical College Hospital, Dhaka, published in 2010, around 6,500,000 people of Bangladesh are prone to suicide. The rate is 128.08 people per 100,000 dying by suicide in Bangladesh every year. The six-member team led by Dr AHM Feroz and Dr SM Nurul Islam of the medical college conducted the survey at Mominpur union of Chuadanga district from January to April 2010. But this has been noted that the above rate was assumed only based on survey conducted in one union which is not a good reflector of the total suicide rate in the whole country as total suicide rate per year is far less than what was mentioned in the report in the last couple of years.

According to a report by The Daily Star, from 2002 to 2009, 73,389 people died by suicide in Bangladesh. Of these 73,389 people, 31,857 people hanged themselves and 41,532 swallowed poison to kill themselves. Bangladesh Manabadhikar Bastabayan Sangstha, a human rights group of Bangladesh shows that from January 2011 to August 2011, 258 people died by suicide, and of them, 158 were women and the remainder were men.

Suicide of women 
According to a 2010 report by Shaheed Suhrawardy Medical College Hospital, of the 128.08 per 100,000 people who died by suicide in 2010, 89% were women and most of them were unmarried. Statistics from Jatiya Mahila Ainjibi Samity, a Bangladeshi women's organization, show that from 2006 to 2010, 40 girls who died by suicide were victims of stalking. From 2001 to 2010, 4,747 women and girls died by suicide because of physical and domestic violence.

According to a report published in the Lancet published in BBC News, suicidal tendency among women in Bangladesh is higher, because they have inferior status in society. Another factor is a higher rate of illiteracy and their economic dependence on men.

2007 Adam House cult suicide
In 2007, in Mymensingh, a family of nine died by mass suicide by hurling themselves onto a train. According to the diaries recovered from their home, they wanted a pure life as lived by Adam and Eve, freeing themselves from bondage to any religion.

Prevention 
Non-profit Kaan Pete Roi provides mental health support via a free crisis helpline.

Common methods 
Hanging is the most common method of suicide in Bangladesh. There is no cost involvement in this method other than ligature material, i.e., a rope, and thus that is why it is the preferred method. Swallowing poison is another common method in Bangladesh to die by suicide. In urban areas, people follow other methods to die by suicide, such as by an overdose of barbiturate tablets, or by other means.

References 

Society of Bangladesh
Bangladesh
Death in Bangladesh